Moose Valley Provincial Park is a provincial park in British Columbia, Canada, located in the South Cariboo region 31 km west of 100 Mile House.

Comprising approximately 2,322 ha, it is located to the north of Gustafsen Lake.

References
BC Parks webpage

Provincial parks of British Columbia
Geography of the Cariboo
1995 establishments in British Columbia
Protected areas established in 1995